The list of Germany Navy ships includes all ships commissioned into German Navy service, since the reunification of Germany in 1990.

See also:
 List of naval ships of Germany for naval ships which have served Germany throughout the country's history.
 List of German Navy ship classes
 List of current German frigates

Surface combatants
Destroyers
101A (Hamburg class) (decommissioned)
D181 Hamburg
D182 Schleswig-Holstein
D183 Bayern
D184 Hessen
103B (Lütjens class) (decommissioned)
D185 Lütjens
D186 Mölders
D187 Rommel
Frigates
122 (Bremen class)
F207 Bremen (decommissioned)
F208 Niedersachsen (decommissioned)
F209 Rheinland-Pfalz (decommissioned)
F210 Emden (decommissioned)
F211 Köln (decommissioned)
F212 Karlsruhe (decommissioned)
F213 Augsburg
F214 Lübeck
123 (Brandenburg class)
F215 Brandenburg
F216 Schleswig-Holstein
F217 Bayern
F218 Mecklenburg-Vorpommern
124 (Sachsen class)
F219 Sachsen
F220 Hamburg
F221 Hessen
125 (Baden-Württemberg class)
F222 Baden-Württemberg
F223 Nordrhein-Westfalen
F224 Sachsen-Anhalt
F225 Rheinland-Pfalz
Corvettes
130 (Braunschweig class)
F260 Braunschweig
F261 Magdeburg
F262 Erfurt
F263 Oldenburg
F264 Ludwigshafen am Rhein
Fast Attack Craft
143 (Albatross class) (decommissioned)
P6111 S61 Albatros
P6112 S62 Falke
P6113 S63 Geier
P6114 S64 Bussard
P6115 S65 Sperber
P6116 S66 Greif
P6117 S67 Kondor
P6118 S68 Seeadler
P6119 S69 Habicht
P6120 S70 Kormoran
143A (Gepard class) (decommissioned)
P6121 S71 Gepard
P6122 S72 Puma
P6123 S73 Hermelin
P6124 S74 Nerz
P6125 S75 Zobel
P6126 S76 Frettchen
P6127 S77 Dachs
P6128 S78 Ozelot
P6129 S79 Wiesel
P6130 S80 Hyäne
148 (Tiger class) (decommissioned)
P6141 S41 Tiger
P6142 S42 Iltis
P6143 S43 Luchs
P6144 S44 Marder
P6145 S45 Leopard
P6146 S46 Fuchs
P6147 S47 Jaguar
P6148 S48 Löwe
P6149 S49 Wolf
P6150 S50 Panther
P6151 S51 Häher
P6152 S52 Storch
P6153 S53 Pelikan
P6154 S54 Elster
P6155 S55 Alk
P6156 S56 Dommel
P6157 S57 Weihe
P6158 S58 Pinguin
P6159 S59 Reiher
P6160 S60 Kranich

Subsurface combatants
Submarines
Type 205 (decommissioned)
S191 U-1
S192 U-2

S188 U-9
S189 U-10
S190 U-11
S191 U-12
Type 206A (decommissioned)
S170 U-21
S171 U-22
S172 U-23
S173 U-24
S174 U-25
S175 U-26
S176 U-27
S177 U-28
S178 U-29
S179 U-30
S192 U-13
S193 U-14
S194 U-15
S195 U-16
S196 U-17
S197 U-18
S198 U-19
S199 U-20
Type 212A
S181 U-31
S182 U-32
S183 U-33
S184 U-34
S185 U-35
S186 U-36

Mine warfare vessels
Minehunters
331 (Fulda class) (upgraded Type 320 Lindau class minesweepers, decommissioned)
M1086 Fulda (—1992)
M1084 Flensburg (1972—1991)
M1072 Lindau (1978—2000)
M1074 Tübingen (1978—1997)
M1085 Minden (1978—1997)
M1071 Koblenz (1978—1999)
M1075 Wetzlar (1978—1995)
M1070 Göttingen (1979—1997)
M1077 Weilheim (1978—1995)
M1087 Völklingen (1979—1999)
M1078 Cuxhaven (1979—2000)
M1080 Marburg (1979—2000)
332 (Frankenthal class)
M1058 Fulda
M1059 Weilheim
M1060 Weiden (decommissioned)
M1061 Rottweil
M1063 Bad Bevensen
M1064 Grömitz
M1065 Dillingen
M1068 Datteln
M1069 Homburg
M1066 Frankenthal (decommissioned)
M1062 Sulzbach-Rosenberg
M1067 Bad Rappenau
333 (Kulmbach class) (decommissioned)
M1091 Kulmbach
M1095 Überherrn
M1099 Herten
M1096 Passau
M1097 Laboe
Minesweepers (Drone control vessels)
351 (Ulm class) (upgraded Type 320 Lindau class minesweepers, decommissioned)
M1083 Ulm (1989—1999)
M1073 Schleswig (1989—2000)
M1082 Wolfsburg (1989—2000)
M1076 Paderborn (1989—2000)
M1079 Düren (1989—2000)
M1079 Konstanz (1989—2000)
352 (Ensdorf class)
M1090 Pegnitz (decommissioned)
M1092 Hameln (decommissioned)
M1093 Auerbach/Oberpfalz (decommissioned)
M1094 Ensdorf
M1098 Siegburg
Mine diver support ships
742 (Mühlhausen class) (decommissioned)
M1052 Mühlhausen

Amphibious warfare ships
Landing craft
520 (Barbe class) (used as transport ships now)
L760 Flunder (decommissioned)
L761 Karpfen (decommissioned)
L762 Lachs
L763 Plötze (decommissioned)
L764 Rochen (decommissioned)
L765 Schlei (decommissioned)
L766 Stör (decommissioned)
L767 Tümmler (decommissioned)
L768 Wels (decommissioned)
L769 Zander (decommissioned)
L788 Butt (decommissioned)
L789 Brasse (decommissioned)
L790 Barbe (decommissioned)
L791 Delphin (decommissioned)
L792 Dorsch (decommissioned)
L793 Felchen (decommissioned)
L794 Forelle (decommissioned)
L795 Inger (decommissioned)
L796 Makrele (decommissioned)
L797 Muräne (decommissioned)

Auxiliary ships
Tenders
401 (Rhein class) (decommissioned)
A58 Rhein
A61 Elbe
A63 Main
A68 Werra
A69 Donau
402 (Mosel class) (decommissioned)
A65 Saar
A67 Mosel
403 (Lahn class) (decommissioned)
A55 Lahn
404 (Elbe class)
A511 Elbe
A512 Mosel
A513 Rhein
A514 Werra
A515 Main
A516 Donau
Replenishment ships
701 (Lüneburg class) (small replenishment ship, decommissioned)
A1411 Lüneburg
A1412 Coburg
A1413 Freiburg
A1414 Glücksburg
A1415 Saarburg
A1416 Nienburg
A1417 Offenburg
A1418 Meersburg
702 (Berlin class) (combat support ship)
A1411 Berlin
A1412 Frankfurt am Main
A1413 Bonn
703 (Walchensee class) (small coastal tanker, decommissioned)
A1424 Walchensee
A1425 Ammersee
A1426 Tegernsee
A1427 Westensee
704 (Rhön class) (tanker)
A1442 Spessart
A1443 Rhön
Transport ships
760 (Westerwald class) (ammunition transport ship, decommissioned)
A1435 Westerwald
A1436 Odenwald
Tugboats
720 (Helgoland class)
A1457 Helgoland (decommissioned 1997)
A1458 Fehmarn
722 (Wangerooge class)
A1451 Wangerooge
A1452 Spiekeroog
A1455 Norderney (decommissioned)
Icebreaker
721 (Eisvogel class) (decommissioned)
A1401 Eisvogel
A1402 Eisbär
Surveillance, (ELINT)
423 (Oste class)
A50 Alster
A52 Oste
A53 Oker
School ships
441 (Gorch Fock class) (3 mast barque)
A60 Gorch Fock II

References

Navy
Ships of the German Navy